The Siemens SXG75 is a candybar-type UMTS triband mobile phone.

This is the first UMTS phone developed by Siemens; previous models (the U10 and the U15) were developed by Motorola. This is also the company's last such device, since the SG75 was cancelled and newer models carried the BenQ-Siemens brand name.

Besides UMTS, it differs from its predecessors in other features:
Integrated GPS receiver;
QVGA display (the SX45 was developed by Casio and the SX56 and SX66 were developed by HTC Corporation);
Brew operating system, capable of multitasking;
2 megapixel camera.

The phone supports Internet access through GPRS and UMTS, but not EDGE.

Technical data

External links 

 Review by Mobile-Review

Mobile phones introduced in 2005
SXG75
Mobile phones with infrared transmitter